Meri Beti is a Pakistani television series premiered on ARY Digital on 9 October 2013. Produced by Fahad Mustafa and Ali Kazmi under the banner of Big Bang Entertainment, serial stars Arij Fatyma, Sabreen Hisbani and Samina Peerzada in lead roles. It was also aired in India on Zindagi TV.

Plot
Saba (Sabreen Hisbani) and her five-year-old daughter Iraj (Mariyam Khalif) live with her mother (Samina Peerzada) after her divorce from her husband. Saba marries Faisal (Shahood Alvi) and leaves Iraj in her mother's care. Ammi tells Iraj that she (Ammi) is her mother and Saba is her elder sister. Iraj falls in love with Asad (Junaid Khan), and they get married. Iraj's mother-in-law finds out the truth from her friend, and asks Asad to leave Iraj.  Iraj approaches Ammi seeking to know the truth. On knowing the truth, she is angry and hurt. She behaves rudely with Ammi and her own mother, causing both of them great distress. Iraj gives birth to a daughter. Asad is not ready to accept his daughter and divorces Iraj. Faisal finds out about Saba as well and leaves Saba.   Ammi eventually dies from the shock. After Ammi's death, Iraj reconciles with Saba. With Iraj's efforts, Faisal reconciles with Saba. He asks Iraj to stay with him as his daughter, but Iraj is unable to agree to it. She decides to live on her own, caring for her daughter Dua. The series ends with Iraj fondly reminiscing the times she spent with her Ammi, the one who lovingly raised her.

Cast
 Arij Fatyma as Iraj
 Sabreen Hisbani as Saba, Iraj's Mother
 Samina Peerzada as Ammi, Iraj's Grandmother
 Shahood Alvi as Faisal, Saba's second husband
 Junaid Khan as Asad, Iraj's Husband
 Ismat Zaidi as Faisal's mother
 Aiman Khan as Rida, Saba and Faisal's daughter
 Shaheen Khan as Asad's mother
 Mariyam Khalif as child Iraj

Soundtrack

See also
 ARY Digital
 Pakistani Dramas
 List of programs broadcast by ARY Digital
 List of Pakistani television serials

References

Pakistani drama television series
ARY Digital original programming
Urdu-language telenovelas
2013 Pakistani television series debuts
2014 Pakistani television series endings